Nils Frykberg (13 March 1888 – 13 December 1966) was a Swedish runner who competed in the 1912 Summer Olympics. He was part of the Swedish 3000 m race team that won a silver medal. Individually he was eliminated in the first round of the 1500 me competition.

References

1888 births
1966 deaths
Swedish male middle-distance runners
Olympic athletes of Sweden
Athletes (track and field) at the 1912 Summer Olympics
Olympic silver medalists for Sweden
Sportspeople from Uppsala
Medalists at the 1912 Summer Olympics
Olympic silver medalists in athletics (track and field)
19th-century Swedish people
20th-century Swedish people